The Oxford University Student Union is the official students' union of the University of Oxford. It is better known in Oxford under the branding Oxford SU or by its previous name of OUSU. It exists to represent Oxford University students in the university's decision-making, to act as the voice for students in the national higher education policy debate, and to provide direct services to the student body. The president for the 2022–23 academic year is Michael-Akolade Ayodeji (University College). Akolade-Ayodeji will be succeeded by Danial Hussain (Lady Margaret Hall).

History
In 1961, the University of Oxford Proctors banned the student magazine Isis from publishing reviews of lectures. Students resisted, and legally incorporated the Oxford University Student Representative Council (OUSRC) for the first time. They then agitated for formal university recognition of the OUSRC, and petitioned the United Kingdom's Privy Council, asking the government to amend the Universities of Oxford and Cambridge Act 1859.  Rather than risk having its hand forced by legislation, the university relented, and formally recognised the OUSRC in 1970.

The OUSRC adopted its contemporary constitution in 1974, changing its name to the Oxford University Student Union, or OUSU. OUSU rebranded itself as Oxford SU in 2017 to improve its image among students at Oxford.

Structure

Membership
Reflecting the collegiate nature of the University of Oxford itself, Oxford SU is both an association of Oxford's more than 21,000 individual students and a federation of the constituent organisations: Junior Common Rooms (JCRs), Middle Common Rooms (MCRs), Graduate Common Rooms (GCRs), and other equivalent organisations that represent undergraduate and graduate students at the university's forty-four colleges and permanent private halls and choose to allocate to the students'union.

Individual students can opt out of membership, although this right is rarely exercised. Individual Common Rooms can also disaffiliate, although few have chosen to do so since Oxford SU started being funded from a block grant from the university rather than through affiliation fees. Oriel College's JCR disaffiliated itself from 2001 to 2010, and again on a temporary basis between January and June 2014; a referendum to disaffiliate permanently failed in 2015. Trinity College's JCR disaffiliated in 2007, holding a referendum on affiliation each year, before reaffiliating in 2014. Christ Church's JCR disaffiliated itself from the Student Union in 2021.

Finances

OSSL has its own managing director and board of directors, and the corporation's profits are all remanded to Oxford SU. OSSL's primary activities are: Freshers' Fair, the three-day introduction in Oxford's Examination Schools to clubs and societies, held during Freshers' week; publishing, primarily of handbooks for and by students, but also of The Oxford Student newspaper and Oxide Radio, a student radio station.

Governance
Oxford SU is made up an executive committee, which includes six full-time salaried sabbatical officers, who generally serve in the year following completion of their Final Examinations, although this is not a requirement, and various part-time elected student positions. Also elected are Divisional Board Representatives who represent the students within their Division.

Oxford SU Council acts as the sovereign body of the Student Union, and has over 150 eligible voting members, specifically: every Oxford SU Executive Officer; every Divisional Board Representative; three representatives from each affiliated JCR; two or three representatives from each affiliated MCR/GCR; three votes representing each of the five Oxford SU Autonomous Liberation Campaigns and one vote representing each SU affiliated campaign.  If a JCR, MCR, or GCR has fewer than 100 members, it receives one fewer Council vote. The Chair of Council is elected by the Council itself in each academic term.

In 2021/22, a governance review was conducted by President Anvee Bhutani which changed all six sabbatical officer positions and notably expanded the VP Women position to VP Liberation and Equality.

Protests and occupations

Shortly before the formation of OUSU in 1974, agitation commenced within certain sections of the student body for a Central Students Union building by the Student Representative Council, forerunner of OUSU. The university feared that the existence of such facilities would be used for the promotion of student activism. In 1972, during the miners strike, students had offered their rooms to miners picketing Didcot Power Station and had supported staff who went on strike at St Anne's College.

On 5 November 1973, an open meeting called for direct action against the university on the issue of a Central Students Union building. Later that day students marched to the Examination Schools and commenced a sit in, which lasted seven days. The University Registrar sent an open letter to all Junior Members threatening proceedings in the High Court and disciplinary action against those who could be identified. The occupation was ended by students themselves after the university obtained a writ of possession.

OUSU was recognised by the university in early January 1974, and a meeting was held on 29 January with the Vice-Chancellor and others. The Vice-Chancellor made it clear that the university was facing deep cuts and there was no money for a CSU project.

The university was expecting a second occupation and contingency plans were drawn up. The Bursar of St John's College wrote to the President of the Junior Common Room on 11 February noting, "all the talk that is going on at the present time about occupation", and stating that in future the Bursary would be kept locked. It was reported that over £9,000 worth of damage had been done to the Examination Schools during the occupation the previous November. On 7 February an Extraordinary OUSU Council Meeting was held. Sue Lukes, David Aaronovitch and others attempted to defeat a motion stating that it was the position of OUSU not to support any occupation of university premises in furtherance of the CSU campaign. When this motion was put, Lukes and Aaronovitch resigned, the former making a speech condemning Council.

The following day, an anonymous flyer was circulated, headed 'Remember 5 November', it gave warning to the university that "You have had three months and your time is up. Negotiations have failed, talking has failed, OUSU has failed. Come to the Open Meeting on Monday night in the Union Hall. And don't forget your sleeping bag!"

At 9.15 am on Wednesday 13 February approximately 50 or 60 students entered the Indian Institute building in Catte Street shouting that they were occupying it and demanding that the people working there should leave. The 22 staff inside stayed at their desks while the students milled around after first closing the doors. What happened next was the subject of bitter dispute. The university claimed that at around 11.30 am, about 50 volunteers, 'relatively elderly gentlemen' working in the Clarendon Building decided out of concern for their colleagues to enter the building.  A secretary let them in through a rear window, and once inside they confronted the intruders, who left in groups through the front door. The spokesman for the university insisted there was no violence, though it was conceded that there was some scrummaging and, 'ears may have been twisted'.

Those supporting the occupiers claimed that the university had set the Oxford University Police upon them who, goaded on by the Proctors, perpetrated acts of violence against the students, and encouraged the police, who were outside, to wade in also. The supporters of the occupiers asserted it was a 'pre-planned and ugly piece of violence'. It was alleged that at least one of the 'relatively elderly gentlemen' was in fact a serving police officer out of uniform, who was identified at a subsequent demonstration.

The university identified those it believed to have been the ringleaders and moved swiftly against them. Eighteen students were charged with an offence under the University Statutes and were required to attend at the Proctor's Office in cap and gown on 21 February under threat of being rusticated if they did not appear. The eighteen included Sue Lukes and another student from Somerville College, three from Magdalen and two each from Pembroke, St John's and Balliol. They were committed for trial at a Disciplinary Court on 11 March, during the Easter vacation. The chairman of the Court was Barry Nicholas, a Professor of Comparative Law. All who attended agreed that the trial was a travesty of justice. Mike Sullivan wrote an open letter describing how the Court decided every procedural point against the defendants; several were expelled for making objections, including Tariq Ali who was acting as a McKenzie friend to some of the defendants. Gordon Day, President of St John's Junior Common Room reported that even Andrew Turek, an ex-President of the university Monday Club and a virulent supporter of disciplinary action being taken against those who occupied University buildings, described the proceedings as a 'farce' and labelled the University Marshall, Mr Skinner, as 'a maniac who should not be allowed on University property'.

On the testimony, mainly, of a University Police Officer, Philip Berry, all of the defendants were convicted of being present at the occupation. It was admitted in Court that the Proctors were present together with other 'employees' of the university and an 'independent contractor' with two of his men. It was conceded that the 'occupation' amounted to nothing more than possession of the stairs and corridors and no violence was at any time offered to University staff. Nevertheless, the eighteen defendants were all sent down with the sentence suspended for one year. A subsequent appeal by thirteen of the defendants failed.

The CSU campaign continued with declining support through the latter half of the 1970s.

1980s: No Platform Referendum 
In December 1985 OUSU adopted a No Platform policy following a controversial invitation to Patrick Harrington to speak at the Brasenose Debating Society. The Oxford University Conservative Association organised a petition of almost 700 signatures, more than the minimum requirement, to put the policy to a referendum of the student union's members. In late February 1986, the No Platform policy was overturned by a vote of 3,152 against with 2,246 in favour.

Protests and occupations 1990s to date

Several student groups participated in protests against the introduction of tuition fees from 1998 onwards, with Oxford students playing a major role in the nationwide Campaign for Free Education. Activities included non-payment campaigns, the occupation of Exam Schools in 1998 and of the Development Office in November 1999, several marches and a short-lived blockade of the University Offices. OUSU support for these protests was limited in 1998, but became more formal during the presidency of Anneliese Dodds (1999). Following another occupation of Exam Schools in January 2004, the university pursued disciplinary action against five OUSU sabbatical officers.

In 2001 and 2007, OUSU led protests against speakers at the Oxford Union. In 2001, Kirsty McNeill led a successful protest to stop the visit of Holocaust denier David Irving to the debating society. In 2007, the Oxford Union attracted condemnation again for inviting Irving and BNP leader Nick Griffin to speak at a "free speech forum". The then OUSU President, Martin McCluskey, led a campaign against the visits which attracted attention and support from national anti-fascist organisations, politicians and media commentators.

Oxford SU has also been mentioned in a Governmental enquiry of freedom of speech in universities due to one of its liberation campaigns disrupting a talk at St John's College organised by a student anti-abortion rights group on abortion in Ireland. A protest started shortly after one of the organisers introduced the speakers and involved chants such as "Pro-life, that’s a lie, you don’t care if women die". The police were called after one of the protesters got into a minor altercation with a security guard, although no arrests were made and the talk eventually started after 40 minutes.

Both the SU and the anti-abortion rights group later issued statements about the event with the SU stating that “We do not believe that the speakers invited should be hosted without challenge. We were not protesting Oxford Students for Life or their speakers’ right to free speech” and also that “bodily autonomy is not up for debate”. The anti-abortion rights group called this “a deliberate attempt to shut down discussion and dialogue through harassment and bullying” and later issued a second statement accusing the SU of breaking the law. One of the speakers later wrote an article for the Irish Times on her experiences of the event.

The SU voted on 10 February 2018 to support Oxford university staff's strike action against proposed changes to the University Superannuation Scheme (USS). Oxford University staff union members voted to join 60 other universities in the national strike action, coordinated by the University and College Union (UCU) after a breakdown in its negotiations with the university employers' representative, Universities UK (UUK), over UUK's proposals to remove the defined benefit element of the USS pension scheme.

Student groups affiliated with the SU have led repeated environmental protests in recent years at the University of Oxford. In 2017, the Paradise Papers showed large Oxford and Cambridge Universities' investments in fossil fuels, prompting student union action, including Cambridge Zero Carbon Society and the Oxford Climate Justice Campaign (an OUSU Environment & Ethics campaign) disrupting the annual Oxford-Cambridge boat race, and the OCJC occupation of St John's College, Oxford, to protest its investments in large multinational fossil fuel companies like BP and Shell. In 2021, the Climate League of Oxford and Cambridge was created to lobby colleges for transparency around climate info.

Controversies

Rashmi Samant 
In 2021, Rashmi Samant, pursuing MSc in Energy Systems at Linacre College, became the first Indian president-elect of Oxford SU. Shortly, several Oxford societies condemned her social media posts for harboring racially insensitive, anti-Semitic, and transphobic sentiments and asked her to resign; Samant apologized and facing multiple successful no-confidence motions at individual colleges, obliged. 

Afterwards, Abhijit Sarkar, a postdoctoral scholar of history of S. Asia at New College, posted a photo of Samant's parents framed with the slogan of Jai Shri Ram — that has been increasingly used in India, as a nationalistic war-cry to perpetrate communal violence — and claimed them to be celebrating the destruction of a mosque in India; Sarkar also claimed Samant's alumna institution in India to be a hotbed of Islamophobic far-right forces. Samant has since alleged that she was "cyber-lynched" into resigning, and that her critics were motivated by racism. The Hindu Nationalist Bharatiya Janata Party demanded that the university probe into the anti-Hindu atmosphere; Indian Minister of External Affairs S. Jaishankar supported Samant and even promised to raise the issue with his British counterparts, if required. 

The Oxford Hindu, Indian, and South Asian societies dismissed Samant's allegations as part of a "misleading narrative", that fed into the "fundamentally exclusionary and discriminatory" nature of Hindutva. An Indian-origin Hindu student went on to win the by-election.

List of presidents

1971 – Emily Wallace (Somerville) was elected OUSRC president, the first president of Oxford students to be officially recognised by the university.
1982 – John Grogan became the first president to succeed in obtaining a seat for students at the university's governing council, in June 1983. He and two other students chosen by OUSU became observers for most of the council's agenda, and this practice was enshrined in the university's Statutes, Decrees, and Regulations.
1985-86 – Matthew Taylor, subsequently became a Liberal Party Member of Parliament and Member of the House of Lords.
1986-87 – Mark Stephens.
1993 – Akaash Maharaj became the first ever visible ethnic minority president and also the first president from overseas (Canada). He helped lead a successful national campaign that thwarted a 1994 government bill to restrict the ability of students' unions to comment on public policy issues and that contributed to the ultimate dismissal from Cabinet of the then Secretary of State for Education, John Patten.
2003 – Will Straw carried out protests against the government's introduction of tuition fees for students, despite his father Jack Straw being a senior member of the government of the day.
2020 – Nikita Ma (Trinity) is the first East Asian president and the first president from Asia.
2021 – Anvee Bhutani (Magdalen) led the first all women of colour SU sabbatical officer team.

References

External links
 Official website

1974 establishments in England
Student organizations established in 1974 
Students' unions in England
SU
Politics of Oxford